Brenna Bird (née Findley) is an American lawyer and politician from Iowa. A member of the Republican Party, she is the incumbent Iowa Attorney General.

Bird grew up on a farm near Dexter, Iowa. She earned her bachelor's degree from Drake University and her Juris Doctor degree from the University of Chicago Law School in 2001. She served as counsel to Governor Terry Branstad and became county attorney for Guthrie County, Iowa in 2018. In 2019, a jury ruled that Branstad and Bird had discriminated against an employee because of his sexual orientation, and awarded him $1.5 million.

Bird ran for Attorney General of Iowa in the 2010 elections and lost to incumbent Tom Miller by 11 percent. She considered running for the U.S. House of Representatives in the 2014 elections, but opted against running. She ran against Miller in the 2022 Iowa Attorney General election. She narrowly defeated Miller, who had served ten four-year terms as attorney general.

References

External links

|-

|-

|-

21st-century American lawyers
21st-century American women lawyers
District attorneys in Iowa
Drake University alumni
Iowa Attorneys General
Iowa Republicans
Living people
People from Dallas County, Iowa
People from Guthrie County, Iowa
University of Chicago Law School alumni
Women in Iowa politics
Year of birth missing (living people)